The 1968 Georgia Tech Yellow Jackets football team represented the Georgia Institute of Technology in the 1968 NCAA University Division football season. The Yellow Jackets were led by second-year head coach Bud Carson and played their home games at Grant Field in Atlanta.

Schedule

References

Georgia Tech
Georgia Tech Yellow Jackets football seasons
Georgia Tech Yellow Jackets football